The 1998 Montana State Bobcats football team was an American football team that represented Montana State University in the Big Sky Conference (Big Sky) during the 1998 NCAA Division I-AA football season. In their fifth season under head coach Cliff Hysell, the Bobcats compiled a 7–4 record (5–3 against Big Sky opponents), tied for second place in the Big Sky, and were ranked No. 25 in the final I-AA poll by The Sports Network (wire service).

The team played its home games in the new Bobcat Stadium in Bozeman, Montana. The new stadium was built on the site of the former Reno H. Sales Stadium. The west side was new and included a combined sky box and press box.

Schedule

References

Montana State
Montana State Bobcats football seasons
Montana State Bobcats football